Lu Kejian (born 1932) is an ethnic Tibetan People's Republic of China politician.

Early life 
In 1932, Lu was born in Jonê County, Gansu province, China.

Career 
Lu started his political career as leader of the Bairi Tibetan Autonomous County in his home province. He served as People's Congress Chairman of his home province. He was a delegate to the 7th National People's Congress, 8th National People's Congress (1993-1998) and the 9th National People's Congress (1998-2003).

References 

1932 births
Living people
Chinese Communist Party politicians from Gansu
People's Republic of China politicians from Gansu
Political office-holders in Gansu
Members of the 6th Chinese People's Political Consultative Conference
Delegates to the 7th National People's Congress
Delegates to the 8th National People's Congress
Delegates to the 9th National People's Congress